Manganoblödite is a rare manganese mineral with the formula Na2Mn(SO4)2·4H2O. Somewhat chemically similar mineral is D'Ansite-(Mn). Manganoblödite was found in the Blue Lizard mine, San Juan County, Utah, US, which is known for several relatively new secondary uranium minerals In the mine, manganoblödite occurs intimately intergrown with manganese-, cobalt- and nickel-enriched blödite and a yet another new mineral - cobaltoblödite. Manganoblödite, as suggested by its name is a manganese-analogue of blödite. It is also analogous to changoite, cobaltoblödite and nickelblödite - all three are members of the blödite group.

Notes on chemistry
Manganoblödite is impure, containing admixtures of magnesium, cobalt and nickel.

Association and origin
Besides blödite and cobaltoblödite, other minerals associated with manganoblödite include chalcanthite, gypsum, johannite, sideronatrite, a feldspar group mineral and quartz.

References

Manganese(II) minerals
Sulfate minerals
Sodium minerals
Monoclinic minerals
Minerals in space group 14